Something Cool is a studio album recorded by June Christy in 1953, 1954, and 1955, and featuring Christy singing 11 (in the original release, seven) jazz songs backed by the orchestra of Pete Rugolo, and her saxophonist husband, Bob Cooper. First issued in 1954 as a 10" mono LP, an expanded 12" mono LP was released the following year, with four newly recorded selections added to the track listing. In 1960, Christy and Rugolo re-recorded all 11 selections in stereo, so that a stereo version of Something Cool could be issued. For many years, this re-recorded version of the LP was the only one commercially available.

Christy had been associated with "cool" jazz since her vocal work with the Stan Kenton Orchestra in the 1940s and early 1950s. As well as launching her career as a solo artist, Something Cool, according to jazz writer John Bush, was responsible for launching the cool movement in jazz singing. It was the first of 18 June Christy albums, most of them recorded with the backing of Pete Rugolo. This debut turned out to be extremely successful with the album reaching the Top-20 album charts in America.

Release history 

Originally released on the Capitol label as a 10" LP (1954, mono) and a 12" LP (1955, mono), Something Cool was re-recorded in stereo with a slightly different personnel and released again under the same title in 1960. It was later rereleased on CD in 1991 with the songs of the 1955 mono LP plus 13 additional tracks, all recorded between 1953 and 1955. Controversially, the songs were sequenced in the order they were recorded, meaning that this package did not duplicate the original running sequence of the album.

In 2001, another CD reissue combined the 11 songs of the original 12" mono LP with the same 11 songs as reissued in stereo in 1960, but leaving out all the "bonus tracks" that did not originally appear on either LP.

Track listing

Original 10" mono LP (1954)
The original release of Something Cool consisted of seven tracks.

Side 1:
 "Something Cool"  (Billy Barnes) – 4:20
 "It Could Happen to You" (Jimmy Van Heusen, Johnny Burke) – 1:58
 "Lonely House" (Kurt Weill, Langston Hughes) – 3:59

Side 2:
 "Midnight Sun" (Lionel Hampton, Sonny Burke, Johnny Mercer) – 3:16
 "I'll Take Romance" (Ben Oakland, Oscar Hammerstein II) – 2:21
 "A Stranger Called the Blues"(Mel Tormé, Robert Wells) – 3:59
 "I Should Care" (Paul Weston, Sammy Cahn, Axel Stordahl) – 2:11

Original 12" mono LP (1955)
The expanded 12" LP added four newly recorded tracks; all these tracks were recorded specifically for the expanded album in early 1955. Two tracks were added to the end of each side, resulting in the following track listing:

Side 1:
 "Something Cool" (Billy Barnes) – 4:20
 "It Could Happen to You"  (Jimmy Van Heusen, Johnny Burke) – 1:58
 "Lonely House" (Kurt Weill, Langston Hughes) – 3:59
 "This Time the Dream's on Me" (Harold Arlen, Johnny Mercer) – 1:32
 "The Night We Called It a Day" (Matt Dennis, Tom Adair) – 4:48

Side 2:
 "Midnight Sun" (Lionel Hampton, Sonny Burke, Johnny Mercer) – 3:16
 "I'll Take Romance" (Ben Oakland, Oscar Hammerstein II) – 2:21
 "A Stranger Called the Blues" (Mel Tormé, Robert Wells) – 3:59
 "I Should Care" (Paul Weston, Sammy Cahn, Axel Stordahl) – 2:11
 "Softly, as in a Morning Sunrise"  (Sigmund Romberg, Oscar Hammerstein II) – 2:21
 "I'm Thrilled"  (Sidney Lippman, Sylvia Dee) – 2:43

Original 12" stereo LP (1960)

This was an entirely re-recorded album, but it duplicated the track listing of the 1955 12" LP (above) track-for-track.

Original CD issue (1991)

This CD presented a range of tracks Christy recorded between 1953 and 1955, including the entirety of the 12" mono Something Cool LP, albeit not in its original running order.

 "Not I" (Sammy Gallop, Dick Manning)
 "Whee Baby" (Peggy Lee, Alice Larson)
 "Why Do You Have to Go Home" (Larry Gilbert, Lee Tompkins)
 "You're Making Me Crazy" (Roy Alfred, Bill Darlel)
 "Something Cool" (Billy Barnes)
 "Magazines" (Dick Rogers, Jimmy Eaton, Larry Wagner)
 "Midnight Sun" (Lionel Hampton, Sonny Burke, Johnny Mercer)
 "Lonely House" (Kurt Weill, Langston Hughes)
 "I Should Care" (Paul Weston, Sammy Cahn, Axel Stordahl)
 "It Could Happen to You" (Jimmy Van Heusen, Johnny Burke)
 "The First Thing You Know, You're in Love" (Mel Tormé)
 "A Stranger Called the Blues"(Mel Tormé, Robert Wells)
 "I'll Take Romance" (Ben Oakland, Oscar Hammerstein II)
 "Look Out up There" (Milt Raskin, Pete Rugolo)
 "Softly, as in a Morning Sunrise" (Sigmund Romberg, Oscar Hammerstein II)
 "Out of Somewhere" (Jimmy Giuffre)
 "Love Doesn't Live Here Anymore" (F.M. Lehman)
 "I'm Thrilled" (Sidney Lippman, Sylvia Dee)
 "This Time the Dream's on Me" (Harold Arlen, Johnny Mercer)
 "The Night We Called It a Day" (Matt Dennis, Tom Adair)
 "Kicks" (Michael Barr, Marvin Fisher)
 "Pete Kelly's Blues" (Ray Heindorf, Sammy Cahn)
 "Until the Real Thing Comes Along" (Mann Holiner, Alberta Nichols, Saul Chaplin, Sammy Cahn, L.E. Freeman)
 "I Never Want to Look into Those Eyes Again" (Milt Raskin, Johnny Mercer)

Note: Tracks 2, 14, 21, 23, and 24, recorded from 1953 to 1955, were originally released on the album This Is June Christy in 1958. Tracks 1, 3, 4, 6, 11, and 22, also recorded from 1953 to 1955, were originally issued only as 45-rpm singles. Tracks 16 and 17 were released for the first time on this CD. This release included the complete contents of the original mono 12" LP release of Something Cool, but not the stereo release.

CD reissue (2001)

In 2001, another CD release appeared, which included only the tracks that appeared on the original Something Cool 12" LP releases.  The program consisted of the mono 12" LP tracks, in their original running order, followed by the stereo 12" LP tracks, again in their original running order.

Personnel

Original session credits
(Combined listing for both mono and stereo sessions, several years apart.)
 June Christy – vocals
 Pete Rugolo – arranger, conductor
 Lee Gillette – session producer
 Harry Babasin – bass
 Frank Beach – trumpet
 Harry Betts – trombone
 Gus Bivona – flute, alto saxophone
 Larry Bunker – drums
 Conte Candoli – trumpet
 Frank Carlson – drums
 Joe Castro – piano
 Geoff Clarkson – piano
 Buddy Collette – reeds
 Bob Cooper – flute, tenor saxophone
 Vincent DeRosa – French horn
 Nick Dimaio – trombone
 Fred Falensby – tenor saxophone
 Maynard Ferguson – trumpet
 Russ Freeman – piano
 Jimmy Giuffre – tenor saxophone
 Bob Gordon – baritone saxophone
 Conrad Gozzo – trumpet
 John Graas – French horn
 Herbie Harper – trombone
 Skeets Herfurt – alto saxophone
 Paul Horn – reeds
 Barney Kessel – guitar
 Harry Klee – flute, alto flute, alto saxophone
 Ray Linn – trumpet
 Shelly Manne – drums
 Jack Marshall – guitar
 Ollie Mitchell – trumpet
 Joe Mondragon – bass
 Ted Nash – flute, tenor saxophone
 Dick Noel – bass trombone
 Tommy Pederson – trombone
 Uan Rasey – trumpet
 Dick Reynolds – trombone
 Tony Rizzi – guitar
 George Roberts – bass trombone
 Shorty Rogers – trumpet
 Frank Rosolino – trombone
 John Rotella – baritone saxophone
 Willie Schwartz – alto saxophone
 Bud Shank – flute, alto flute, alto saxophone
 Paul Smith – piano
 Phil Stephens – tuba
 Alvin Stoller – drums
 Ray Triscari – trumpet
 Claude Williamson – piano
 Jimmy Zito – trumpet

Reissue credits (2001)
 Will Friedwald – liner notes
 Ron McMaster – remixing, mastering
 Michael Cuscuna – reissue producer

References

External links 

 Bush, John. June Christy biography on AllMusic. Accessed April 24, 2011.
 Holden, Stephen. "June Christy, Singer, 64, Is Dead; Gained Fame With Kenton's Band", The New York Times, June 24, 1990. Accessed April 24, 2011.
 Yanow, Scott. [ Something Cool] on AllMusic. Accessed April 24, 2011.

1954 debut albums
June Christy albums
Capitol Records albums
Albums arranged by Pete Rugolo
Albums produced by Michael Cuscuna
Cool jazz albums
Albums conducted by Pete Rugolo